is a Japanese tokusatsu TV series which aired from April 7, 1976 to January 26, 1977. It appeared on TV Tokyo, Channel 12, and was produced by Toei Company, Ltd. Ninja Captor is similar to Toei's own Super Sentai series (it has been sometimes included in Super Sentai chronology as the second installment) and aired during the run of Himitsu Sentai Gorenger.

Story
The character Daisuke Izumo graduates from the Wind-Demon Stealth-Army, a secret army aiming for the conquest of Japan. He instead escapes and becomes the leader of the "Captor," a ninja team supervised by Mujin Tendo. The Captor team's mission is to battle the ninja sent out by the Wind-Demon General, Retsufu Fuma.

Captor team
/. 21 years old. Although he is an elite graduate student of the Fūma Ninja Group, he has against his own thoughts when General Retsufū Fūma begins aiming for conquest in Japan and decided to become a ninja, and was appointed as the leader of the Captors from the former teacher Mujin Tendō.
Weapon: 
Technique: 
Color: Red
Element: Fire
/. 15 years old. He is the youngest Captor and a third-year middle school student. He has a strong friendship and trusts his classmates strongly, but he is reckless and certainly fails his recognized efforts. After Nindo Kurayami was dead in the final episode, he and Maria are getting married for a wedding.
Weapon: 
Color: Green
Element: Air
 /. 17 years old. A high school student who is a ninja in training and is responsible of the maintenance of Captor Car and Captor Machine. He also works part-time at the electronics store.
Weapon: 
Color: Yellow
Element: Metal
 /. 23 years old. Has extraordinary hearing ability. He is in charge of operating the Captor Machine. He usually works out at the wrestling gym and works part-time at the transportation industry.
Weapon: 
Color: Brown
Element: Earth
 /. 15 years old. She poses as Keita's guardian and has a bright personality. Keita refers to her as his sister. After the devastation of the Fūma Ninja Group, she was invited for the ninja society at the college in the United States. After Nindo Kurayami was dead in the final episode, she and Keita are getting married for a wedding.
Weapon: 
Color: Pink
Element: Nature
 /: 15 years old. Mujin's granddaughter. While watching the Captors' success, she becomes Maria's successor after Maria visits the United States.
 /. 22 years old. A third-year student of the Naboku University who also works as a swimming instructor. He usually teaches children at the swimming lessons.
Weapon: 
Color: Blue
Element: Water
 /. 45 years old. A sentimental butler of Mujin Tendō and the oldest of the Captors. He hates dust and likes to keep the house tidy. He is also good at finding things by using his nose.
Weapon: 
Color: Orange
Element: Thunder

Staff
Created by Saburo Yatsude
Produced by Toru Hirayama, Kohito Ono, Bakosu Kondo
Directed by Hideo Tanaka, Atsuo Okunaka, Daisuke Yamazaki, Kyomi Nakamura
Teleplays by Masaru Igami, Shukei Nagasaka, Chikusa Enda, Mikio Matsushita
Character Design by Yuki Hijiri
Action Choreography by Kazutoshi Takahashi
Music by Akihiro Omori
Theme Songs: Opening "Fight! Ninja Captors", and Ending "Captors of the Open Skies" (vocals by Ichirou Mizuki, Mitsuko Horie, Koorogi '73)

Cast
Daisuke Izumo:  (as )
Keita Izumi: 
Noboru Ōyama:  (as )
Dan Kurokawa: 
María Sakurakōji: 
Miki Tendō: 
Sakon Shijō: 
Saburōbei Fukuro: 
Mujin Tendō(1-37): 
Hakūn Togakushi(37-43): 
Jūrō Ōmori: 
Hyōdai Kōtō: 
Kansuke Yamahara: 
Tamibe Itō: 
Magoyatsu Imura: 
Kenta Yaki: 
Ayame Mizuno: 
Retsufū Fūma/Nindō Kurayami: 
Officer Kageyama: 
Officer Sanada: 
Officer Hattori: 
Narrator:

Episode list
 
 
 
 
 
 
 
 
 
 
 
 
 
 
 
 
 
 
 
 
 
 
 
 
 
 
 
 
 
 
 
 
 
 
 
 
 
 
 
 
 
 
 

1976 Japanese television series debuts
1977 Japanese television series endings
Ninja fiction
Tokusatsu television series
Toei tokusatsu
TV Tokyo original programming